This is a list of lighthouses and lightvessels in Taiwan.

Northern Taiwan 

Pengjia Lighthouse (Pengjia Islet, Keelung) 
Keelung Island Lighthouse (Keelung Islet, Keelung) 
Keelung Lighthouse (Keelung Harbor, Keelung)
Ciouzishan Lighthouse (Keelung Harbor, Keelung)
Tamsui Harbor Lighthouse (Tamsui District, New Taipei) 
Yeliou Lighthouse (Wanli District, New Taipei) 
Fuguijiao Lighthouse (Shimen District, New Taipei) 
Bitoujiao Lighthouse (Ruifang District, New Taipei) 
Cape San Diego Lighthouse (Gongliao District, New Taipei) 
Baishajia Lighthouse (Guanyin District, Taoyuan City)

Central Taiwan 
Gaomei Lighthouse (Qingshui District, Taichung City)
Taichung Port Lighthouse (Wuqi District, Taichung City) 
Fangyuan Lighthouse (Fangyuan Township, Changhua County) 
Wengangduei Lighthouse (Kouhu Township, Yunlin County)

Southern Taiwan 

Guosheng Port Lighthouse (Cigu District, Tainan City) 
Anping Lighthouse (Anping District, Tainan) 
Kaohsiung Lighthouse (Cijin District, Kaohsiung)  	
Eluanbi Lighthouse (Hengchun Township, Pingtung County)

Eastern Taiwan 

Su'ao Lighthouse (Su-ao Township, Yilan County) 
Cilaibi Lighthouse (Hualien City, Hualien County) 
Hualien Port Lighthouse (Hualien City, Hualien County) 
Lyudao Lighthouse (Green Island, Taitung County) 
Lanyu Lighthouse (Orchid Island, Taitung County)

Penghu 
Mudouyu Lighthouse (Mudou Islet) 
Yuwengdao Lighthouse (Yuweng Island, Penghu County) 
Huayu Lighthouse (Hua Islet, Penghu County)  
Chamu Island Lighthouse (Chamu Islet, Penghu County) 
Dongji Island Lighthouse (Dongji Island, Penghu County) 
Qimei Lighthouse (Cimei Islet, Penghu County)

Kinmen 
 Wuqiu Lighthouse (Wuqiu (Ockseu, Wuchiu)) 
 Beiding Island Lighthouse (Beiding Island) 
 Dongding Island Lighthouse (Dongding Island)

Matsu (Lienchiang County)
 Dongyong Lighthouse (Dongyin Island) 
 Dongquan Lighthouse (Dongjyu Island)

Pratas and Spratlys 
 Tai-ping Island Lighthouse
 Tung-sha Island Lighthouse (to be reestablished)

See also
 Lists of lighthouses and lightvessels

External links

List of Taiwan lighthouses - Directorate General of Customs, Republic of China
 

Taiwan

Lighthouses
Lighthouses